The Collège en Isle (in Latin Gymnasium Societatis Iesu in insula, Leodii) was a Jesuit secondary school located on the île de la Meuse in the Principality of Liège. Founded in 1582, it passed into other hands on the suppression of the Jesuits in 1773. Its pedagogical tradition was continued by the collège Saint-Servais, founded in Liège in 1828.

See also
 List of Jesuit sites

Buildings and structures in Liège
Education in Liège
Jesuit secondary schools in Belgium